Ekseption 5 is the fifth studio album by the Dutch progressive rock band Ekseption, released in 1972.

Track listing

References 

1972 albums
Philips Records albums